Albert Barnett Facey (31 August 1894  –  11 February 1982), publishing as A.B. Facey was an Australian writer and World War I veteran, whose main work was his autobiography, A Fortunate Life, now considered a classic of Australian literature.  it has sold over one million copies and was the subject of a television mini-series.

Early life
Facey was born in Maidstone, Victoria, the son of Joseph Facey and Mary Ann Facey, née Carr. His father died on the goldfields of Western Australia in 1896 of typhoid fever, when Albert was two years old. In 1898, Albert's mother departed for Western Australia to care for her older children, who had accompanied their father to the goldfields. She left her younger children, including Albert, to the care of their grandmother. When his grandfather died in 1898, the grandmother, Mrs Jane Carr, (née Barnett), moved with Albert and his siblings Roy (born 1890), Eric (born 1889) and Myra (born 1892) in 1899 from Barkers Creek near Castlemaine, Victoria, to Kalgoorlie, Western Australia. He began his working life around 1902, aged eight, and hardly ever lived with his family again. He was never able to attend school, but he managed to teach himself to read and write when he was in his teens.

On his first job as a farm boy, his employer subjected him to virtual slavery and violent beatings with a horse whip. After sustaining months of such abuse, Albert escaped by walking over  through the bush and luckily finding some new settlers that had camped. Although the police were informed of the abuse, his employer was never prosecuted. The scars on his back and neck from the injuries he had sustained remained evident for the rest of his life.

In 1908 Facey's mother remarried, and he travelled at her request to Perth to live with her and her second husband, a plumber named Arthur "Bill" Downie at Subiaco. However, he only stayed a short time before accepting work back in rural Western Australia. Thereafter Facey and his mother saw each other sporadically until she died suddenly in September 1914, aged 51. His childhood in Western Australia was spent in areas such as Kalgoorlie, Narrogin, Bruce Rock, Merredin, Yealering, Wickepin, Pingelly, and at Cave Rock, near Popanyinning, which he writes about in Chapter 2 of A Fortunate Life.

By the age of 14 he was an experienced farm labourer and bushman, and at 20 he became a professional boxer with a troupe that toured South Australia, Victoria and New South Wales. His boxing career continued until he enlisted in the Australian Imperial Force (AIF) in January 1915.

War service
Facey joined the AIF on 4 January 1915, not long after the outbreak of the First World War. He travelled to Egypt as an infantryman with the 11th Battalion, 3rd Reinforcement, aboard the troopship  and fought during the Gallipoli Campaign, including the battle of Leane's Trench. Much of his autobiography relates to the horror he endured during his wartime service and his vivid recollections of the plight of the ANZAC Diggers at Gallipoli. Two of his older brothers, Roy Barker Facey (1890–1915) and Joseph Thomas Facey (1883–1915) were killed during the campaign.

Facey tells in his book of being wounded on more than one occasion at Gallipoli. This culminated on 19 August 1915although Facey "was uncertain about dates"when a shell exploded near him and he received severe internal injuries and wounds to his leg. However, his war records show no evidence of being wounded, only of heart trouble. While records make no mention of any ordnance exploding near any 11th Battalion troops on (or about) 19 Augustit was quiet, after a week in reserve the 11th Battalion was redistributed between the 9th and 10th Battalions at Anzac on 18 August.

Facey was invalided back to Australia on the ship  on 31 October 1915.

Family life and career

Marriage

After being returned to Australia, Facey met Evelyn Mary Gibson (1897–1976), whom he married at Bunbury on 24 August 1916. They were happily married for nearly 60 years before Evelyn died on 3 August 1976. He mourned her for the rest of his life. The couple had seven children, born between 1919 and 1939.

Facey became an active public campaigner for improved conditions for Australian returned servicemen. The family lived at Victoria Park, before returning with their children to farm at Wickepin, from 1922 to 1934.

After he returned from the war, Facey worked as a tram driver (1916–1922), and on his return from Wickepin, as a trolleybus driver (1934–1946) in Perth. He then spent the rest of his working life as a successful self-employed poultry and pig farmer and businessman (1947–1958) in areas such as Tuart Hill, Wanneroo, Gosnells and Mount Helena near Mundaring.

Facey was active in public life and known in his community from the 1920s until he retired in the late 1950s. He was president of the Perth Tramways Union for five years and later an elected member of local government and the Perth Roads Board for over 20 years, and a justice of the peace.

Loss of son
Facey's eldest son, also named Albert Barnett Facey and known as Barney, 1919–1942, joined the Second AIF during the Second World War and served with the 2/4th Machine Gun Battalion. He died in a bombing raid on 15 March 1942, during the Battle of Singapore against the Japanese Army. While his family were aware that he was missing in action, his death was not confirmed until May 1945. Facey stated in his memoirs that although he and his wife had assumed their son had been killed, they had not given up hope. After that wait of over three years, his wife's health deteriorated to such an extent that she suffered a major stroke. Two other sons, Joseph and George, also served in the Australian Army in World War II, both seeing action in New Guinea. They returned home safely at the end of 1945.

Later health
Facey attributed his later health issues to war-related injuries received at Gallipoli, including old bullet wounds and a ruptured spleen, although his war records show no evidence of being injured in his WWI service at all. He arrived at Gallipoli on 7 May 1915, after which the only issue to his health was tachycardia, diagnosed as heart trouble at Gallipoli on 19 August and the reason for his evacuation back to Australia in October 1915. He did not re-enlist.

Facey suffered a major heart attack in 1958 (aged 64), and retired.

Memoirs and fame
Facey began making notes on his life, and at the urging of his wife and children, eventually had the notes printed into a book. He completed his memoirs on his 83rd birthday, in 1977. Two years later, at 85, he learnt that his autobiography, A Fortunate Life, had been approved for publication. It was published in 1981, just nine months before his death.

Although Facey was delighted that his life story was appreciated on such a grand scale, his health was rapidly declining and he was losing his eyesight. He also needed a wheelchair due to a broken hip. His book became a bestseller and won New South Wales Premier's Literary Award for non-fiction and the National Book Council Prize. During the final six months of his life, Facey became a national celebrity and was nominated for the Australian of the Year award in 1981.

Death
While in an Aged Care Facility with his broken hip, Facey died of natural causes at Midland on 11 February 1982, aged 87. His body was buried at the local Midland Cemetery. He was survived by six of his seven children and his 28 grandchildren.

Television adaptation
 
His novel of A Fortunate Life was made into a four-part television film in 1985, based on Facey's life between 1897 and 1916. The cast included Bill Hunter, Val Lehman and Ray Meagher.

Legacy
Facey's homestead in Wickepin was turned into a tourist attraction. A government building named Albert Facey House on Forrest Place in Perth was named in his honour – it houses the Public Utilities Office of the Department of Finance and other agencies. His name is also borne by the Albert Facey Memorial Library in Mundaring, Facey Road in Gnangara, Albert Facey Street in Maidstone, Barney Street in Glendalough (named after his late son), and a motel in Narrogin. The manuscripts of A Fortunate Life are housed in the Special Collections in the University of Western Australia Library.

References

Further reading

about-australia.com.au, 2010, Albert Facey Homestead
Facey, A. B. (1988)  A Fortunate Life, Ringwood Vic., Penguin. . (Previously published in 1981 by Fremantle Arts Centre Press, Fremantle, W.A.)
 Findlay, Len. "A Son's Fortunate life with no regrets" The West Australian 11 June 2007 p. 71
Registry of Births, Deaths and Marriages, Victoria (1997), Federation index. Victoria 1889–1901, Melbourne, Registry of Births, Deaths and Marriages.

Australian memoirists
1894 births
1982 deaths
Writers from Perth, Western Australia
Subiaco Football Club players
Australian rules footballers from Western Australia
Australian military personnel of World War I
20th-century memoirists